Claude Ambrose Virgin (8 June 1928 – 1 December 2006) was an American-born British fashion photographer, particularly for British Vogue.

He was born in Atlanta, Georgia;

Virgin's first wife was Margaret Barch; they had one daughter. His second wife was Jillie Bateman; they had two sons.

References

1928 births
2006 deaths
20th-century American photographers
20th-century British photographers
Fashion photographers